The 1964 United States presidential election in Idaho took place on November 3, 1964, as part of the 1964 United States presidential election, which was held throughout all 50 states and D.C. Voters chose four representatives, or electors to the Electoral College, who voted for president and vice president.

Idaho was one of 44 states carried in a national landslide by incumbent President Lyndon B. Johnson. However, it was the weakest state that Johnson carried in the election. Johnson carried the state by a margin of 5,363 votes, or 1.83%, making Idaho’s vote about 20.75 percent more Republican than the national average. Johnson’s strongest performances were in Clearwater and Lewis counties where he took over 76% of the vote. Goldwater’s strongest performance was Jerome County, taking 63% of the vote. While Johnson carried slightly over half of the state’s 44 counties, Goldwater carried the more populated counties such as Ada, Bonneville, Canyon and Twin Falls, thus keeping the vote close.

This is the last presidential election where Idaho was carried by a Democrat, and although Goldwater lost, this election solidified Idaho as a stronghold of the Republican Party, for the state trended 13.02 percentage points Republican relative to the national swing – the smallest Democratic swing outside the old Confederacy. In eight counties, Goldwater gained a higher proportion of the vote than Richard Nixon had four years earlier – a result observed in only nine other counties outside antebellum slave states. Apart from massively Catholic Emmons County, North Dakota, Camas and Custer were the solitary counties outside antebellum slave states to vote for Kennedy in 1960 and Goldwater in 1964.

No Democrat since Johnson has been able to get forty percent of Idaho’s popular vote, while the only Republicans to fail to pass fifty-five percent have been George H. W. Bush in 1992 and Bob Dole in 1996, when strong third-party candidacies from Ross Perot distorted results.

At a more local level, the only counties in Idaho to have ever given a Democrat a majority or plurality since 1968 have been Teton in the far east, Blaine in the centre of the state, and the seven northern counties of, clockwise from north, Bonner, Shoshone, Clearwater, Lewis, Nez Perce, Latah, and Benewah Counties. Of these, Bonner County was carried only by a narrow Bill Clinton plurality in 1992 as a result of strong support for Ross Perot cutting into the Republican vote whilst Benewah County were carried only by a narrow Carter majority in 1976 and Bill Clinton plurality in 1992. The Republicans would go on to sweep all forty-four of Idaho's counties in 1972, 1980 and 1984, and all but one, Blaine County, in 2000 and 2004. Since then, only Blaine, Latah, and Teton Counties have been carried by Democrats, although rapidly-urbanizing Ada County (not carried by Johnson) was extremely competitive in 2020. As a result, this remains the last election in which Kootenai County, Bannock County, Elmore County, Gem County, Idaho County, Fremont County, Boundary County, Washington County, Valley County, Power County, Boise County, Caribou County, Bear Lake County, Adams County, and Butte County voted for a Democratic presidential candidate.

Results

Results by county

See also
 United States presidential elections in Idaho

Notes

References

External links
OurCampaigns - ID US President Race, Nov 3, 1964

1964
Idaho
1964 Idaho elections